The Today Art Museum is a museum located in Beijing.

References

Museums in Beijing
Art museums and galleries in China
Art museums established in 2002
2002 establishments in China